B&P may refer to:
Baltimore and Potomac Rail Road
Boston and Providence Railroad
Buffalo and Pittsburgh Railroad
Bid and proposal